USS Paloma (SP-533) was an  yacht acquired by the U.S. Navy during World War I. She was outfitted as an armed patrol boat and assigned to patrol the waterways near Boston, Massachusetts. She spent two years of the war patrolling for German submarines, and performing other duties, such as escorting larger ships. After the war, her services were no longer needed, and she was sold.

Early history 
Paloma was built by Murray & Tregurthe, South Boston, Massachusetts.  The Navy took her over soon after the U.S. entered World War I and placed her in commission on 4 May 1917. She was purchased by the government 17 May 1917.

World War I service 
Throughout the "Great War" and for several months after the November 1918 Armistice, she was employed on section patrol duties in the Boston area.

Post-war decommissioning  
Paloma was struck from the Naval Register and sold 19 July 1919.

References 

  
 USS Paloma (SP-533), 1917-1919. It used to be the civilian motor boat Paloma (built 1914)

Individual yachts
Ships built in Boston
1914 ships
Patrol vessels of the United States Navy
World War I patrol vessels of the United States